The Tallinn Higher Military-Political Construction School was one of the military academies of the Soviet Union. In the years it existed, it trained military personnel in a number of specializations. It was located in Tallinn, which was the capital of the former Estonian SSR.

History 
It was created by the Council of Ministers of the USSR of on 18 August 1979. It was formed in on the basis of the 64th course of the political staff of the Land Forces. On 30 October 1980, the Tallinn Military-Political Building School was awarded the Battle Flag. The first graduation of cadets place in 1984. On 28 April 1992, TVVPSU produced ahead of schedule the last graduation of 255 officers. Along with the military profession, they received the qualification of "social educator". Until the end of May 1992, about 700 cadets were transferred to other military schools in Russia.

Transfer of the Military School to the Estonian Authorities 
Jägala training center, located outside of Tallinn, was part of the school. It was handed over by Soviet/Russian forces to the Kalevi Battalion of Estonian Defence forces in 1992. This transfer was also the first peaceful take-over done by the Estonian Armed Forces. Former masters were given three days to move out and take their clothing and food supplies with them. The Estonian authorities refused to appeal to TVVPSU command with requests for permission to export property and equipment to Russia. But despite the difficulties, valuable property was managed to be taken out by air and transferred to other military schools, part of the property and the universal computing complex were transferred to the Russian Embassy in Estonia, the rest to military units deployed in Tallinn, which came under the jurisdiction of the Russian Armed Forces. In early June 1992, the Battle Banner of the school was deposited at the Central Museum of the Armed Forces, the dissolution of the university was completed on April 25, 1993.

Activities

School structure 
 Leadership
 Head of the school
 Deputy head of the school
 Training department
 Political department
 Human Resources
 Combat department
 Finance department
 RAV service
 Services of ware and food supply, fuels and lubricants
 Housing and operational department
 Automotive service

Studies  
 Tactics and military disciplines
 Foreign languages
 History of the Communist Party of the Soviet Union
 Military pedagogy and psychology
 Organization (in the field of economics, technology and military construction)
 Philosophy
 Political Economics
 Engineering design
 Military buildings and special structures
 Scientific communism
 Physical training and sports
 Military technical disciplines

Support and service units 
 Military Band
 Educational Training Battalion
 Medical Service
 Technical Laboratory

List of leaders

Heads of the School 
 Vasily Gnezdilov (1979-1987)
 Yevgeny Aunapu (1987-1991)
 Boris Bachin (1991-1992)

Deputy heads of the school 
 Dmitry Ostrolutsky (1980—1982)
 Valery Vishnevsky (1982—1991) 
 Sergey Porshnev (1991—1992)

Notable graduates 

Alar Laneman – Estonian Brigadier General and member of the 14th Riigikogu.
Andres Valme – Editor-in-chief of the newspaper "Golden Province"
Mikhail Porechenkov – Russian film actor, producer, director who became famous after playing as FSB Agent Alexey Nikolayev in the TV series National Security Agent (1999–2005).
Igor Panchuk – Officer in the Russian Armed Forces.
Rajabali Rakhmonaliev – Officer in the Tajik Armed Forces who served as the former commander of the 7th Airborne Assault Brigade and the National Guard.

See also 
 Riga Higher Military Political School
 Baltic Defence College
 Jägala Army Base

References 

Estonian Soviet Socialist Republic
Educational institutions established in 1979
Political-Military Educational Institutions
Military academies of the Soviet Army